There is no national plastic bag fee or ban currently in effect in the United States. However, the states of California, Connecticut, Delaware, Hawaii (de facto), Maine, New Jersey, New York, Oregon, Vermont, and Washington, and the territories of American Samoa, Guam, Northern Mariana Islands, United States Virgin Islands and Puerto Rico have banned disposable bags. Additionally, the Colorado General Assembly passed a law banning disposable bags in Colorado which will take effect in 2024. Over 200 counties and municipalities have enacted ordinances either imposing a fee on plastic bags or banning them outright, including all counties in Hawaii.

Some attempts at banning plastic shopping bags statewide (for example in Massachusetts, though as of May 2022, 152 cities and towns in the state have done so) have not succeeded mainly due to plastic industry lobbying. A few jurisdictions have chosen to implement a fee-only approach to bag reduction such as Washington, D.C., Montgomery County, Maryland, and certain counties in Virginia. Some state legislatures, such as the Florida Legislature and the Arizona State Legislature, have passed laws preventing local municipalities from passing their own bans. Some retailers have stopped using plastic bags ahead of government mandates.

Summary of plastic bag laws

()

Notes
  The City of Fort Collins, Colorado passed a 5¢ fee on single-use bags on 19 August 2014, and repealed it on 21 October 2014.
  Although the state of Hawaii does not ban plastic bags, all of its local jurisdictions do, effectively banning them statewide.
  On June 22, 2018, the Texas Supreme Court ruled that a bag ban implemented by Laredo, TX was in violation of state law. In response, Texas Attorney General Ken Paxton sent letters to 11 other Texas cities with bag bans telling them that such bans were now illegal and unenforceable. On July 3, 2018, the City of Austin announced that it would end enforcement of its bag ban.
 Minnesota has a preemption on local laws that ban plastic bags, but allows for fees on them instead.

California 
Californians voted in November 2016 to approve state legislation banning plastic bags statewide in Propositions 67 and 65. Over 100 local laws with similar or tougher regulations will remain and supersede the statewide legislation.

Notes:
  The San Mateo County Environmental Impact Report also studied six cities in neighboring Santa Clara County. Campbell, Los Altos, Los Gatos, and Mountain View opted to join San Mateo County's ordinance because of this.

Notes and references

Footnotes

References

Further reading
 

Plastics and the environment
Shopping bags
Lightweight plastic bags in the United States
Waste minimisation